Route 116 is a highway in northern Missouri.  Its eastern terminus is at Route A in Braymer; its western terminus is at U.S. Route 59 in Rushville.

Route description

History
Route 116 from Plattsburg to U.S. Route 169 was originally part of Route 33 until that highway was re-routed in 1934.

Major intersections

References

116
Transportation in Buchanan County, Missouri
Transportation in Clinton County, Missouri
Transportation in Caldwell County, Missouri